Hamad Međedović (born 18 July 2003) is a Serbian tennis player.

On 20 March 2023, Međedović reached his career-high ATP singles ranking of world No. 192. On 24 May 2021, he peaked at No. 1267 in the doubles rankings.

Međedović has a career-high ITF junior combined ranking of world No. 9 achieved on 4 January 2021.

Career

2021: ATP debut
Međedović made his ATP main draw debut at the 2021 Belgrade Open after receiving a wildcard for the singles and doubles main draws.

2022: Maiden Challenger title 
Međedović reached the final at the 2022 Platzmann-Sauerland Open as a qualifier, eliminating both fourth-seeded Marco Cecchinato and top seed Nicolás Jarry en route. He then defeated Zhang Zhizhen in less than an hour in the final winning his maiden Challenger title.

2023: First ATP win, Davis Cup and top 200 debut
In 2023, Medjedovic recorded his first ATP Tour win, when he made his debut in the Davis Cup by beating Viktor Durasovic in the tie against Norway which Serbia won 4:0.

In March 2023, Medjedovic won his second Challenger title at the Kiskút Open after defeating Nino Serdarušić in the final in straight sets. With this win, he became the fourth Serbian teenager to win multiple Challenger titles, joining Novak Djokovic and Janko Tipsarevic (with 3), and Miomir Kecmanovic (with 2). As a result he climbed into the top 200 at world No. 192 on 20 March 2023.

ATP Challenger Tour and ITF World Tennis Tour finals

Singles: 4 (4–0)

Doubles: 1 (1 title, 0 runner-up)

References

External links

2003 births
Living people
Serbian male tennis players
Sportspeople from Novi Pazar
Tennis players from Belgrade
Bosniaks of Serbia